Terrelle Gallo (known by his stage name, Sissy Nobby) is an American bounce artist from New Orleans, known for his hit songs, "Consequences"  and "Gitty Up". Gallo is credited as one of the main pioneers of bounce music.

Personal life
Nobby is gay.

Sissy Nobby's first label was Survival Records Bounce Entertainment. It was there at the age of 15 where he became known as "Sissy Nobby". Prior to this, he was known as Miss Peaches. His first hit song was titled "Yippy". His overall greatest hit to date has been "Consequences".

References

Living people
Rappers from New Orleans
1983 births
21st-century American rappers
LGBT rappers
African-American male rappers
21st-century American male musicians
21st-century African-American musicians
20th-century African-American people